Pico del Águila (en: Beak of the Eagle)  is a tabular mountain at the limits of the Alcarria altiplano, or high plain. It lies in the Spanish province of Guadalajara with a prominent drop of about 200 m at its northern side.

Access is provided by dirt tracks from the east, north and west side.

References 

Mountains of Spain